The Lagonda 3-Litre is an automobile which was produced by Aston Martin Lagonda from 1953 until 1958. It was the second Lagonda model of the David Brown/Aston Martin era. The 3-Litre was fitted with a higher displacement 2.9 L 140 bhp version of the twin overhead camshaft Lagonda Straight-6 engine designed by Walter Owen Bentley.

Like its predecessor, the 3-Litre was available as a 4-seat 2-door coupé, built by David Brown subsidiary engineering company Tickford or as a drophead coupé produced by the same coach builders. A 4-door saloon was introduced in 1954 and the 2-door coupé was discontinued in 1956. In early 1955, the Mark II version introduced a floor-mounted gear lever.

The car had a separate cruciform braced chassis and the suspension was independent all round, unusual for a car of its time, but utilising this form the previous 2.6-litre car, with the addition of a Jackall system. At the front there were coil springs and at the rear torsion bars and a swing axle.

The interior was luxurious with polished walnut for the dashboard and door trims and leather seats, individual in the front and a bench at the rear with a central fold down arm rest. There were also adjustable arm rests on the front doors. A heater, radio and built in hydraulic jacks were standard equipment. Single or two tone paint schemes were available.

The 3-Litre was more expensive than its competitors and a total of just 270 of the three bodystyles were sold. The convertible ended production in 1957 (ca. 55 made), with the saloon following one year later.  Despite the model's rarity, one Lagonda 3-Litre was destroyed in a "classic banger" race in 2014.

The Lagonda Rapide of 1961 was a final attempt to revive the Lagonda name as a luxury saloon counterpart to Aston Martin's GT cars.

Performance

The test car cost £2993 including taxes of £998.

Trivia
In the 2016 television series Endeavour Season 3 Episode 1 "Ride" the character Anthony Donn drives a blue Laconia Drophead, nicknamed "Bluebell"
In the 2020 television adaptation of Agatha Christie's The Pale Horse the character played by Rufus Sewell drives a 3-Litre drophead coupé.
 In the 1954 movie Profile the character played by John Bentley drove a 3 lite drophead.

References

   4. See the web-site: www.DB-Lagonda.com

3-Litre
Cars introduced in 1953